Janagaraj is an Indian actor who has appeared in over 200 films predominantly in Tamil cinema as a comedian or in supporting roles. He also starred in few Malayalam, Telugu and Hindi films.

Early life 
Janagaraj was born to Vadivelu and Muthulakshmi in Chennai Tamil Nadu. He joined the Auditor General's Office as a Junior Division Clerk in 1976 and worked part-time as a theatre artist and a stage artist due to his desire to act and perform. He was friendly with Delhi Ganesh, another AGS employee who remains his closest friend to date.

Janagaraj joined Director Bharathiraja as his unofficial assistant. After seeing his talent during the shooting of Kizhake Pogum Rail, Bharathiraja gave him the chance to act as a Brahmin in the same movie. Later in Puthiya Vaarpugal, Bharathiraja gave Janagaraj another sensational character as a minor boy of the villain (G. Srinivasan). Janagaraj had acted with a trouser and baniyan for that movie.

Janagaraj found his break in 1980 in Bharathiraja's Nizhalgal and was among the most wanted comedians, having shared roles with major film stars like Sivakumar, Rajinikanth, Kamal Haasan, Ramki, Sivaji Ganesan and with major film directors like Mani Ratnam, K. Balachander and Suresh Krishna.

Film career

Beginning 
In 1978, he was introduced by director Bharathiraja in Kizhake Pogum Rail and he continued to give chance to him in his films Puthiya Vaarpugal (1979), Kaadhal Oviyam (1982) and Oru Kaidhiyin Diary (1985).

Janagaraj's career however spun to silver in the 1980s. Starting with Nizhalgal (1980), continuing in Sindhu Bhairavi (1985), Palaivana Rojakkal (1986), Muthal Vasantham (1986), Agni Natchathiram (1988), Rajadhi Raja (1989) and Apoorva Sagodharargal (1989). Janagaraj became a popular comedian in Tamil films. He is known for his peculiar voice and face expression. He has also acted in supporting roles in films like Nayakan (1987), Kizhakku Vasal (1990), Annamalai (1992) and Baashha (1995). He was main sidekick for Kamal Haasan and Rajinikanth in 80s and early 90s films. Suruli Rajan's untimely death pushed him to forefront for roles that demanded comedy as well as character support.

Later years 
His latest roles were in King (2002), Aayutha Ezhuthu (2004) and M. Kumaran S/O Mahalakshmi (2004) as supporting roles. He acted a negative role in Aayudham (2005). After a hiatus, Janagaraj made his acting comeback with 96 (2018) and Dha Dha 87 (2019).

Award 
 Tamil Nadu State Film Award for Best Character Artiste (Male) for – King (2002)

Filmography

References

External links 

Living people
Tamil male actors
Male actors in Tamil cinema
Tamil comedians
Tamil Nadu State Film Awards winners
1955 births